Brian Rogers may refer to:

 Brian Rogers (baseball) (born 1982), relief pitcher in Major League Baseball
 Brian Rogers (fighter) (born 1984), American mixed martial arts fighter
 Brian D. Rogers (born 1950), chancellor of the University of Alaska Fairbanks
 Brian Rogers (academic), psychologist and academic
 Brian Rogers, drummer for American reggae band The Toyes
 The Brian Rogers Connection, in-house dance troupe on the UK television series 3-2-1
 Brian Rogers (Home and Away), fictional character from Australian soap opera Home and Away
 Brian Rogers, guitarist for American indie rock bands Self and Fluid Ounces